Songs of Our Soil is the fourth studio album by American singer Johnny Cash. It was originally released on July 6, 1959, and later re-issued on August 27, 2002 with two additional bonus tracks.

The major theme throughout this album is death. Death concludes "The Man on the Hill", "Hank and Joe and Me", "Clementine" and "My Grandfather's Clock." "Don't Step on Mother's Roses" is about a family losing their parents to death; first Mother, then Daddy. "The Great Speckled Bird" is a spiritual about the Second Coming of Jesus. "The Caretaker" is the story of a cemetery caretaker wondering who will mourn for him when his time comes. Even "Five Feet High and Rising" ("the hives are gone; I lost my bees") and "Old Apache Squaw" ("...the next white man that sees my face is gonna be a dead white man") mention death in some way. "I Want to Go Home" is a retitled version of the nautical standard "The John B. Sails".

By his own admission, Cash was becoming fascinated by death during this time, in part due to his growing amphetamine and barbiturate dependence, and also due to the premature death of his brother.

Track listing

Personnel
Johnny Cash - vocals, rhythm guitar
Luther Perkins - lead guitar
Marshall Grant - bass
Marvin Hughes - piano
Buddy Harman - drums
The Jordanaires - backing vocals

Additional personnel
Don Law - Original Recording Producer
Al Quaglieri - Reissue Producer
Seth Foster - Engineer
Mark Wilder - Mastering, Mixing
Billy Altman - Liner Notes
Don Hunstein - Photography
Steven Berkowitz - A&R
Howard Fritzson - Art Direction
Randall Martin - Design
John Christiana - Packaging Manager

Charts
Singles - Billboard (United States)

References

External links
 LP Discography entry on Songs of Our Soil

Johnny Cash albums
1959 albums
Columbia Records albums